Aspergillus flaschentraegeri is a species of fungus in the genus Aspergillus. It is from the Cremei section. The species was first described in 1964.

References 

flaschentraegeri
Fungi described in 1964